Dąbrowa Chotomowska  is a village in the administrative district of Gmina Jabłonna, within Legionowo County, Masovian Voivodeship, in east-central Poland.

The village has a population of 623.

References

http://www.jablonna.pl/index.php?cmd=zawartosc&opt=pokaz&id=788&lang= 

Villages in Legionowo County